Dr. Jayadeva Yogendra (1929–2018) was an Indian yoga guru, researcher, author, educator and president of The Yoga Institute, the oldest organized yoga center in the world, founded by Yogendra in 1918. Dr. Yogendra was known for studies on therapeutic effects of Yoga. He pioneered yoga education and has written several books on the therapeutic effects of the ancient science, including Yoga Therapy in Asthma, Diabetes, Heart Disease and Yoga Sutras of Patanjali.

In 1991, Dr. Jayadeva designed the first standardized yoga syllabus for National Council of Educational Research and Training.

He died on 17 February 2018 in Mumbai.

Early life and education 

Jayadeva was born to father Yogendra, a renowned yoga guru and mother Sita Devi on 27 April 1929. He completed his Master's degree in Sāmkhya and Yoga from the University of Mumbai in 1952. In 1955, he received the Hargobindas scholarship for a Ph.D. for his thesis on Moksha Dharma Parva of the Mahabharata. After completing his Ph.D., Dr. Jayadeva  worked as a lecturer, who taught Sanskrit at the Guru Nanak Khalsa College, Bombay. He was appointed principal of Teacher Training Institute of Yoga, Bombay, in 1957.

Work 
His significant contribution to Yoga renaissance is the introduction of the Bhavas of Buddhi as expounded in the Sāmkhya, along with the practice of Patañjali's classical Yoga.

He prepared the syllabus for teaching Yoga in schools for NCERT in 1991. Dr. Jayendra was also the editor of Yoga & Total Health, a monthly journal, published since 1933.

He edited a book ‘Yoga Today’ published by Macmillan Co. of India in 1971. The book carries authentic information on the applicability of yoga for human society.

In 1997, Jayadeva Yogendra organized the International Conference called WHY- World Householders Yoga Conference, which was presided over by the Dalai Lama. He established the first museum on Yoga in 1987, which was inaugurated by Giani Zail Singh, President of India.

He was the Governing Body member in Central Council for Research in Indian Medicine and Homeopathy and also member of Scientific Advisory Board of Yoga. He carried a survey of Yogis in India and history of Yoga literature published in Yoga and Modern Life 1961.

Bibliography 
Dr. Jayadeva has authored several books and edited the Yoga Cyclopedia Series.

 Yoga of Caring (1997), 
 Yoga Therapy in Asthma, Diabetes and Heart Disease (1987), 
 Yogic life : a cure for asthma & bronchitis (1993), 
 Pregnancy, parenthood & Yoga (1994)
 Insights through Yoga (2000),  
 Problems and Solutions (2006), 
 Your Words Our Path (2005), 
 Inspiration (2003), 
 Reflections (1999), 
 Master Strokes Volume I  (2004), 
 Master Strokes Volume II (2006), 
  Yoga Sutras of Patanjali (2009), 
 Yoga Cyclopedia Volume I – Asanas and hundred topics starting with letter ‘A’ (1988), 
 Yoga Cyclopedia Volume II – Letter ‘B’ and Yoga Education for the Child and the Adult (1988), 
 Yoga Cyclopedia Volume III – Stress Management and Mental Health (1993)
 Yoga Cyclopedia Volume IV – Mystics and Demystifying Mysticism (2006), 
 Yoga in Modern Life (1996)
 Yoga Today

Recantation 
 Dr. Jayadeva received the Bhagwandas Purshotamdas Prize for Sanskrit.
 He was featured in Who's Who India in 1972 and 2000.

Death 

Jayadeva Yogendra died on 16 February 2018. He was survived by his wife Hansa and son Hrishi. The Ministry of AYUSH and Morarji Desai National Institute of Yoga paid tribute to Jayendra Yogendra at the International Yoga Festival in New Delhi on 22 March 2018.

Further reading

References

External links 
 Official website of The Yoga Institute
 Outlook toward Yoga has changed on The Afternoon Despatch & Courier (Interview published on 28 July 1937)
 Celebs add to incorrect image of Yoga on The Asian Age (pg.21 & 23)
 Remembering the life and times of Dr. Jayadeva Yogendra on Yoga.in

1929 births
2018 deaths
Indian Hindus
Indian spiritual writers
Scholars from Mumbai
Indian yoga teachers